Philip Doran (born 2 September 1988), better known by the stage name Sister Sister, is a British drag queen from Liverpool, England who is best known for competing on the second series of RuPaul's Drag Race UK.

Career 
Sister Sister started pursuing their career as a drag performer in 2012, and cites British comedians Dawn French, Jennifer Saunders and Victoria Wood as influences for their drag persona, as well as British drag queen Lily Savage. She began her career in London. In December 2020, Sister Sister was announced as one of twelve contestants competing on the second series of RuPaul's Drag Race UK, where they place sixth overall. In February 2022, Sister Sister embarked on RuPaul's Drag Race UK: The Official Tour with the series 2 cast, in association with World of Wonder and promoter Voss Events.

Personal life
Sister Sister currently resides in Liverpool, England.

Sister Sister spoke out against online abuse she had received whilst appearing on the second series of RuPaul's Drag Race UK. In an essay for The Guardian in February 2021, the Liverpool-based entertainer said "Without going into too much detail, one [post] that came from a blank profile described in graphic detail how they would like to see me die” and mentioned that their mental health "reached rock bottom" during the peak of the online abuse she was receiving. Discussing her experience on BBC Radio 5 Live in March 2021, Sister Sister urged people to be more considerate online - particularly given the impact of the COVID-19 pandemic. "The new normal is that we're all talking online, so we have to really consider... how does this sound?," she told host of the programme Naga Munchetty. She received support from a variety of Drag Race contestants including fellow series 2 contestants Bimini Bon-Boulash, Tayce and Asttina Mandella.

Filmography

Television

Discography

As featured artist

Stage

References

External links 
 Philip Doran at IMDb
 

1988 births
Living people
20th-century LGBT people
21st-century LGBT people
English drag queens
Gay entertainers
People from Liverpool
RuPaul's Drag Race UK contestants